Struever is a surname. Notable people with the name include:

 Martha Hopkins Struever (1931–2017), American Indian art dealer, author
 Nancy Struever (born 1928), American historian
 Stuart Struever (born 1931), American archaeologist and anthropologist